Dear Diary is the second extended play by South Korean singer Yoon Ji-sung. The album was released digitally and physically on April 25, 2019 by LM Entertainment. The album contains five tracks, including the lead single "I'll be there".

Background 
On April 15, the album trailer was released, followed by the tracklist, concept photos and music video teasers. A highlight medley was also released on Yoon's VLIVE channel and YouTube account, leading up to the full release of the album on April 25. On May 14, the epilogue for the album was released on YouTube as a parting gift to fans before Yoon's military enlistment that day.

Track listing

Charts

Sales

References 

2019 EPs
K-pop EPs